Mario Mieli (21 May 1952, Milan – 12 March 1983) was an Italian activist, writer, playwright, and gender studies theorist. He is considered one of the founders of the Italian homosexual movement, and one of the leading theoreticians in Italian homosexual activism. He is best known for his essay Elementi di critica omosessuale (Homosexuality and liberation: elements of a gay critique) published in its first edition in 1977, and was one of the founders of FUORI! (Fronte Unitario Omosessuale Rivoluzionario Italiano, United Italian Homosexual Revolutionary Front).

Works

Books

Plays 

 Ciò detto, passo oltre
 Krakatoa

Pamphlets 
Towards a Gay Communism [London: pirate productions, 1980]

References

1952 births
1983 deaths
1983 suicides
20th-century Italian dramatists and playwrights
Italian male dramatists and playwrights
20th-century Italian Jews
Italian Marxists
Jewish dramatists and playwrights
Jewish socialists
Italian LGBT dramatists and playwrights
Gay dramatists and playwrights
Gay Jews
LGBT-related suicides
Suicides by gas
Italian gay writers